Markus Büchel (14 May 1959 – 9 July 2013) was a former head of government of Liechtenstein.

Prime Minister of Liechtenstein

Büchel was in office as Prime Minister of Liechtenstein from May to December 1993. He won the elections in 1993 as a candidate for the conservative FBP (Fortschrittliche Bürgerpartei) (Progressive Citizens' Party).

Later life
In 2002, Büchel became Honorary Consul of Russia in Liechtenstein.  

He died in 2013, aged 54. Büchel was survived by his wife, Elena, and his son David.

See also
 Politics of Liechtenstein

References

Heads of government of Liechtenstein
1959 births
2013 deaths
Honorary consuls of Russia
Progressive Citizens' Party politicians
University of Bern alumni